Oran Faville (October 13, 1817 – November 2, 1872) was an American politician from Iowa.

Biography
Faville, a Republican, served as the first Lieutenant Governor of Iowa from 1858 to 1860 under fellow Republican, Governor Ralph P. Lowe. He was also later an Iowa superintendent of public instruction (1864–1867). He was the last secretary of the state board of education before the title of the office was changed to "superintendent of public instruction", and then was the first person to serve in the office under its new titular style. He was also the first county judge of Mitchell County, Iowa in 1851. Despite its title, the office was predominantly an executive one; the county judge ran the county much in the manner that the modern Board of Supervisors does today.

Fanville was born in Mannheim, Herkimer County, New York, great-grandson of Captain John Faville, shown on the Continental rolls as in command at Fishkill, New York, during the American Revolution.  Faville was educated at Wesleyan University. He then taught school in New York and Vermont.  Later, he was a professor at McKendree College and the president of the Ohio Wesleyan Female College in Delaware, Ohio. In the 1850s, he moved to Mitchell County, Iowa and entered politics.

After his death, he was interred at Oak Grove Cemetery in Mitchell County. His brothers are buried at Mitchell, including Minor S. Faville, alongside their great-grandfather. Oran retired to Waverly, Bremer County, Iowa, and is buried there with his wife, and his aged mother in the local cemetery.

Notes

External links
Political Graveyard

Lieutenant Governors of Iowa
1817 births
Wesleyan University alumni
McKendree University faculty
Ohio Wesleyan University
1872 deaths
19th-century American politicians